Sophie Kasiki  (born 1981 Kinshasa, Congo) is the pseudonym of the French-language author of the 2016 book Dans la nuit de Daech (Trans: "In the night of ISIS"), co-authored by Pauline Guéna.

In the book, Kasiki recounts her experience of having converted to Islam and, after recruitment by young men who had disguised their allegiance to the Islamic State of Iraq and the Levant (ISIS), her abandonment of her marriage and move to Raqqa, Syria in September 2014 with her four-year-old son, ostensibly to work in a hospital. Kasiki, who spent two months in the city, was ultimately locked in a building for foreign women where mothers and children watched beheading videos for entertainment. Kasiki escaped and took refuge with a local family, who risked their lives to help her cross the Turkish border and return to France.

Kasiki was interrogated by French authorities and jailed after her arrival for another two months, during which she was isolated from her family. "Sophie Kasiki" is a pseudonym used by the woman (who is Congolese) to avoid ISIS retaliation; although photographed in shadow and in partial profile, Kasiki has not shown her face to the media. Kasiki currently faces possible child abduction charges.

Bibliography

References 

1981 births
Living people
Democratic Republic of the Congo Muslims
Converts to Islam
Islamic State of Iraq and the Levant members
Democratic Republic of the Congo writers in French